Hjernevask ("Brainwash") is a Norwegian documentary miniseries about science that aired on NRK1 in 2010. The series, consisting of seven episodes, was created for NRK and presented by the comedian and sociologist Harald Eia.

The series contrasted cultural determinist models of human behavior (also referred to as the Standard social science model) with nature-nurture interactionist perspectives. In support of the cultural determinist perspective it interviewed mainly Norwegian humanities scholars, in particular literary theorist Jørgen Lorentzen at the Centre for Gender Research. Experts interviewed for the series in support of a nature-nurture interactionist perspective included Simon Baron-Cohen, Steven Pinker, Simon LeVay, David Buss, Glenn Wilson, Robert Plomin and Anne Campbell. This ignited a wide public discussion on the subject of the nature versus nurture debate, and especially focused on the views expressed by Lorentzen. The entire series has since been released online.

Objectives and awards
Eia and coproducer Ole Martin Ihle have named Steven Pinker's book The Blank Slate as an inspiration for the documentary series. The series was a huge success, and Eia was awarded the Fritt Ord Award for "having precipitated one of the most heated debates on research in recent times".

Episodes 
The producers have made the series available online. Episodes linked in the external links have English subtitles available.

Reception

Hjernevask led to extensive public debate, largely focused on the views expressed in the program by literary scholar Jørgen Lorentzen at the Centre for Gender Research. Lorentzen's description of the research of psychologists Simon Baron-Cohen, Anne Campbell and Richard Lippa as "weak science" was strongly criticized by many commentators; biologist Trond Amundsen pointed out that Lorentzen's work was cited less than 30 times in academic literature and responded that "the characteristic 'weak science' would be rude and uncollegial if Lorentzen was a leading international expert and the three researchers were in fact not so meritorious. But all three are meritorious international researchers [...] against this background, the statement is just embarrassing."

Lorentzen accused his critics including "Ottar Brox, Stig Frøland, Tor K. Larsen and others" of being "cowardly hyenas" who have shown "neither insight into nor interest in gender research." Lorentzen also accused series creator Eia of being motivated by a midlife crisis. Eia pointed out that Lorentzen has a very limited scholarly impact with few international publications and a very low number of citations, and said that he wouldn't have interviewed Lorentzen for the series if he had known at the time that Lorentzen was "such a low-level researcher." Jon Hustad accused Lorentzen of being "blinded by ideology." In response to claims by Lorentzen that NRK had portrayed him unfairly and misrepresented his comments, NRK made all the raw footage available. Lorentzen complained to the Norwegian Press Complaints Commission (PFU). In June 2010 PFU concluded that NRK had not violated press ethics or portrayed Lorentzen in an unfair manner; the chairman of PFU described Hjernevask as a "solid work" of investigative journalism. Eia received the 2010 Fritt Ord Honorary Award for the series.

Several years after Hjernevask aired, it was reported that it has been used in Eastern Europe to promote false claims that all gender studies research in Norway has been closed down in its aftermath; Harald Eia commented that he did not make Hjernevask for a Hungarian audience, and that he wanted to showcase the arrogance he felt Lorentzen displayed towards other research fields for a Norwegian audience.

References

External links
IMDb
Internet Archive playlist
DailyMotion playlist
YouTube playlist

2010 Norwegian television series debuts
Norwegian documentary television series
NRK original programming
Documentary films about science
Nature educational television series
Science education television series
Documentary television series about science
Documentary films about race and ethnicity
Sexual orientation and science
Sociobiology
Evolutionary psychology
Evolutionary biology
2010s Norwegian television series
2010 Norwegian television series endings
Race and intelligence controversy